Freycinetia multiflora is a species of flowering plant in the family Pandanaceae, found from the Philippines to Sulawesi.

References

multiflora
Taxa named by Elmer Drew Merrill
Plants described in 1907